Odontoscion dentex, also known as the reef croaker, is a species of fish in the family Sciaenidae. It lives resides in corals and reefs of the tropical Western Atlantic, living as solitary individuals or in small groups at a depth of 1 - 30 meters. Dentex feeds on small fish, shrimp, and larvae.

References 

Fish described in 1830
Fish of the Atlantic Ocean
Sciaenidae